Phosphatidylglycerol is a glycerophospholipid found in pulmonary surfactant and in the plasma membrane where it directly activates lipid-gated ion channels.

The general structure of phosphatidylglycerol consists of a L-glycerol 3-phosphate backbone ester-bonded to either saturated or unsaturated fatty acids on carbons 1 and 2.  The head group substituent glycerol is bonded through a phosphomonoester. It is the precursor of surfactant and its presence (>0.3) in the amniotic fluid of the newborn indicates fetal lung maturity.

Approximately 98% of alveolar wall surface area is due to the presence of type I cells, with type II cells producing pulmonary surfactant covering around 2% of the alveolar walls. Once surfactant is secreted by the type II cells, it must be spread over the remaining type I cellular surface area. Phosphatidylglycerol is thought to be important in spreading of surfactant over the Type I cellular surface area. The major surfactant deficiency in premature infants relates to the lack of phosphatidylglycerol, even though it comprises less than 5% of pulmonary surfactant phospholipids. It is synthesized by head group exchange of a phosphatidylcholine enriched phospholipid using the enzyme phospholipase D.

Biosynthesis

Phosphatidic acid reacts with CTP, producing CDP-diacylglycerol, with loss of pyrophosphate. Glycerol-3-phosphate reacts with CDP-diacylglycerol to form phosphatidylglycerol phosphate, while CMP is released. The phosphate group is hydrolysed forming phosphatidylglycerol. Phosphatidylglycerol combines with CDP-DAG forming cardiolipin releasing CMP by the action of cardiolipin synthase.

Two phosphatidylglycerols form cardiolipin, the constituent molecule of the mitochondrial inner membrane. In eukaryotic mitochondria phosphatidylglycerol is converted to cardiolipin by reacting with a molecule of cytidine diphosphate diglyceride in a reaction catalyzed by cardiolipin synthase (Hostetler KY, van den Bosch H, van Deenen LL. The mechanism of cardiolipin biosynthesis in liver mitochondria. Biochim Biophys Acta. 1972 Mar 23;260(3):507-13. doi: 10.1016/0005-2760(72)90065-3. PMID: 4556770).

See also
 Glycerol
 Cardiolipin
 Lipid-gated_ion_channels

References 
3.  Hostetler KY, van den Bosch H, van Deenen LL. The mechanism of cardiolipin biosynthesis in liver mitochondria. Biochim Biophys Acta. 1972 Mar 23;260(3):507-13. doi: 10.1016/0005-2760(72)90065-3. PMID: 4556770.

External links
 

Phospholipids
Membrane biology